The Kurfürstendamm (colloquially Ku'damm,) is one of the most famous avenues in Berlin. (Sometimes called Ku'damm in short ). The street takes its name from the former Kurfürsten (prince-electors) of Brandenburg. The broad, long boulevard can be considered the Champs-Élysées of Berlin and is lined with shops, houses, hotels and restaurants. In particular, many fashion designers have their shops there, as well as several car manufacturers' show rooms.

Description
The avenue includes four lines of plane trees and runs for  through the city. It branches off from the Breitscheidplatz, where the ruins of the Kaiser Wilhelm Memorial Church stand, and leads southwestward up to the district of Grunewald.

At the junction with Joachimstaler Straße it passes the Café Kranzler, successor of the Café des Westens, a famous venue for artists and bohémiens of the pre–World War I era. The Kurfürstendamm U-Bahn station and the Swissôtel Berlin  can be found at the same junction. One block farther, near Uhlandstraße U-Bahn station, is the Hotel Bristol Berlin (formerly Kempinski) hotel as well as the Theater am Kurfürstendamm, at the site of a former exhibition hall of the Berlin Secession art association.

At Adenauerplatz the boulevard reaches the district of Wilmersdorf, where it passes the Schaubühne theatre on Lehniner Platz. The more sober western or "upper" end of the Kurfürstendamm is marked by the Berlin-Halensee railway station on the Ringbahn line and the junction with the Bundesautobahn 100 (Stadtring) at the Rathenauplatz roundabout, featuring the long-disputed 1987 "Beton Cadillacs" sculpture by Wolf Vostell.

History
Unlike the adjacent streets, the Kurfürstendamm developed out of a historic corduroy road laid out by the Brandenburg margraves to reach the Grunewald hunting lodge, which was erected about 1542 at the behest of the Hohenzollern elector Joachim II Hector. Although the exact date of the building is unknown, an unnamed causeway leading from the Stadtschloss through the swampy area between the settlements of Charlottenburg (then called Lietzow) and Wilmersdorf to Grunewald is already depicted in a 1685 map. The name Churfürsten Damm was first mentioned between 1767 and 1787.

In 1882, Ernst Werner von Siemens presented his Elektromote trolley bus concept at an experimental track near Halensee station. The nearby Lunapark opened in 1909, then Europe's largest amusement park, modelled on Coney Island, where boxer Max Schmeling won his first title of a German Lightheavyweight Champion in 1926. After a long period of decline the park was finally closed in 1933. Large parts are today covered by the Stadtautobahn.

In 1913 the new Marmorhaus cinema opened. A number of major film premieres were held here during the silent era.

Especially during the "Golden Twenties" the Kurfürstendamm area of the "New West" was a centre of leisure and nightlife in Berlin, an era that ended with the Great Depression and the Nazi Machtergreifung in 1933. 
On Sep 12, 1931, radical antisemite, Nazi Wolf-Heinrich Graf von Helldorff organizes a riot, about a thousand men appear from within the crowd on the streets and start attacking people who they think are Jewish, scream at them and then they beat them, scream anti-Jewish threats at them.

On July 15, 1935, about 200 Nazi Storm Troopers went on a sadistic attack, in "the most brutal anti-Jewish manifestation since Hitler's rise to power," with Hitler's instigation,
and Nazi managed press blaming the victims. Varian Fry who witnessed the brutality, reported to the New York Times, was effected by it and it "turned him into an ardent anti-Nazi."
The shops and businesses owned by Jewish tradespeople became the target of several pogroms, culminating in the "Reichskristallnacht" of 9 November 1938. In World War II the boulevard suffered severe damage from air raids and the Battle of Berlin.

Nevertheless, after the war rebuilding started quickly, and when Berlin was separated into East and West Berlin, the Kurfürstendamm became the leading commercial street of West Berlin in its Wirtschaftswunder days. For that reason, too, John F. Kennedy's tour of West Berlin on June 26, 1963, included a portion of it.  A few years later, the Kurfürstendamm became the site of protests and major demonstrations by the German student movement. On 11 April 1968, spokesman Rudi Dutschke was shot in the head while leaving the office of the Sozialistischer Deutscher Studentenbund on Kurfürstendamm No. 140.

After German reunification the Kurfürstendamm had to compete with central places like Potsdamer Platz, Friedrichstraße, and Alexanderplatz, which led to the closing of numerous cafés and cinemas. It retained the character of a flâneur and upscale shopping street as the western continuation of the Tauentzienstraße with its large department stores.

The globally unique international art project United Buddy Bears was presented in Berlin on the Kurfürstendamm during the summer of 2011.

See also
City West

References

External links

Kurfürstendamm 360° Panorama
kurfuerstendamm.de cityguide
"23rd Hour, 23rd Psalm" Chapter includes midnight visit by Americans to the Ku'damm in 1969-71 period.

Streets in Berlin
Charlottenburg-Wilmersdorf
Shopping districts and streets in Germany